Cyprus made its Paralympic Games début at the 1988 Summer Paralympics in Seoul, with a delegation of six athletes competing in archery, track and field, and swimming. The country has taken part in every subsequent edition of the Summer Paralympics, but has never participated in the Winter Paralympics.

Cyprus did not win any medals until the 2004 Games in Athens, where swimmer Karolina Pelendritou became the first Cypriot Paralympic champion, in the women's 100m breaststroke (SB13 category). Other medals were won at the 2008 Games in Beijing: a gold, two silver and a bronze. Pelendritou went on to win her fourth and Cyprus' sixth Paralympic medal at 2012 Games in London with a silver medal in the 100m breaststroke (SB12 category).

List of medallists

See also
 Cyprus at the Olympics

References